Holoaden, the highland frogs, is a small genus of frogs in the family Strabomantidae. The species are endemic to south-eastern Brazil.

Taxonomy
Holoaden is the type genus of subfamily Holoadeninae that was erected in 2008 and placed in the newly erected family Strabomantidae. Prior to this, it had been placed in the genus Brachycephalidae.

Description
Holoaden grow to  snout–vent length at most. Head is narrower than the body. Differentiated tympanic membrane and tympanic annulus are absent. Dorsum is highly glandular. Venter is areolate.

Species
There are four recognized species in this genus:
 Holoaden bradei Lutz, 1958
 Holoaden luederwaldti Miranda-Ribeiro, 1920
 Holoaden pholeter Pombal, Siqueira, Dorigo, Vrcibradic, and Rocha, 2008
 Holoaden suarezi Martins and Zaher, 2013

References

 
Strabomantidae
Endemic fauna of Brazil
Amphibians of South America
Amphibian genera
Taxa named by Alípio de Miranda-Ribeiro